Jordanian cuisine is a Middle Eastern cuisine that has the traditional style of food preparation originating from, or commonly used in, Jordan that has developed through centuries of social and political change.

There are a wide variety of techniques used in Jordanian cuisine ranging from baking, sautéeing and grilling to stuffing of vegetables (courgettes, capsicum, eggplants, etc.). Meat is an important component of Jordanian cuisine. The most common types of meat in Jordan are lamb, beef, chicken and sometimes goat and camel meat. Also common in Jordanian cuisine is roasting or preparing foods with special sauces.

Rice plays an important role in Jordanian cuisine. It is commonly served as a side dish to main meals, but there are also plenty of one-pot rice dishes such as maqloubah.

As one of the largest producers of olives in the world, olive oil is the main cooking oil in Jordan. Herbs, garlic, onion, tomato sauce and lemon are typical flavors found in Jordan. 

The blend of spices called za'atar contains a common local herb called sumac that grows wild in Jordan and is closely identified with Jordanian and other Middle Eastern countries. 

Yogurt is commonly served alongside food and is a common ingredient itself; in particular, jameed, a form of dried yogurt is unique to Jordanian cuisine and a main ingredient in mansaf the national dish of Jordan, and a symbol in Jordanian culture for generosity.

Another famous meat dish in Jordan is zarb. It is especially popular in areas inhabited by Bedouin tribes such as Petra and the desert of Wadi Rum where it is commonly served to tourists. Zarb is prepared in a submerged oven called a taboon, and is considered a delicacy. It consists of a selection of meat (usually chicken and lamb), vegetables (zucchini, eggplant, carrots, potatoes) and is served with rice and various meze, such as tabbouleh salad.

Internationally known foods which are common and popular everyday snacks in Jordan include hummus, which is a purée of chick peas blended with tahini, lemon, and garlic, and falafel, a deep-fried ball or patty made from ground chickpeas. 

A typical mezze includes foods such as kibbeh, labaneh, baba ghanoush, tabbouleh, olives and pickles. Bread, rice, freekeh and bulgur all have a role in Jordanian cuisine.

Popular desserts include baklava, knafeh, halva and qatayef (a dish made specially for Ramadan), in addition to seasonal fruits such as watermelons, figs and cactus pear which are served in summer.

Turkish coffee and tea flavored with mint or sage are almost ubiquitous in Jordan. Arabic coffee is also usually served on more formal occasions.

Food culture and traditions

Jordanian cuisine is a part of Levantine cuisine and shares many traits and similarities with the cuisine of Lebanon, Palestine and Syria, often with some local variations. More generally Jordanian cuisine is influenced by historical connections to the cuisine of Turkey and the former Ottoman Empire. Jordanian cuisine is also influenced by the cuisines of groups who have made a home for themselves in modern Jordan, including Armenians, Circassians, Iraqis, Palestinians, and Syrians.

Food is a very important aspect of Jordanian culture. In villages, meals are a community event with immediate and extended family present. In addition, food is commonly used by Jordanians to express their hospitality and generosity. Jordanians serve family, friends, and guests with great pride in their homes, no matter how modest their means. A "Jordanian invitation" means that one is expected to bring nothing and eat everything.

Celebrations in Jordan are marked with dishes from Jordanian cuisine spread out and served to the guests.  Customs such as weddings, birth of a child, funerals, birthdays and specific religious and national ceremonies such as Ramadan and Jordan's independence day all call for splendid food to be served to guests. To celebrate the birth of a child, karawiya, a caraway-flavoured pudding, is commonly served to guests.

Jordanian culinary

Main dishes

Mezze

By far the most dominant style of eating in Jordan, mezze is the small plate, salad, appetizer, community-style eating, aided by dipping, dunking and otherwise scooping with bread. Mezze plates are typically rolled out before larger main dishes.

A typical Jordanian mezze might include any combination of the following:

Salads

Soups

In Jordan, meals are usually started with soups. Jordanian soups are usually named after their main ingredient such as:

Sandwiches

Bread
 Abud—a dense, unleavened traditional Jordanian Bedouin flatbread baked directly in a wood fire by burying in ash and covering with hot embers.
 Ka'ak (كعك)—a traditional Jordanian bread made mostly in a large leaf- or ring-shape and covered with sesame seeds.
 Karadeesh—a traditional Jordanian bread made from corn.
 Khubz (خبز, pita): Literally, "generic" bread, with a pocket.
 Shrak—a traditional Bedouin bread, popular in Jordan and the region as a whole. It is thrown to great thinness before being tossed onto a hot iron griddle called saj that's shaped like an inverted wok. Also known as markook (خبز).
 Taboon (خبز طابون‎)—a flatbread wrap used in many cuisines. It is traditionally baked in a tabun oven and eaten with different fillings. Also known as laffa bread, it is sold as street food, stuffed with hummus, falafel or shaved meat.

Sweets
 Baklava (بقلاوة)—a dessert made with thin layers of phyllo pastry filled with chopped nuts and soaked in honey or syrup.
 Halva (حلوى)—a Middle-Eastern confection made from sesame flour and milk mixed with other ingredients, typically made with pistachios.
 Knafeh (كُنافة)—a cheese pastry of shredded phyllo soaked in sugar-based syrup.
 Qatayef (قطايف)—a sweet dumpling stuffed with cream and pistachios. Consumed during Ramadan.
 Warbat (وربات)—a pastry of thin layers of phyllo pastry filled with custard. Often eaten during the month of Ramadan.

Beverages
 Arabic coffee (Qahwa sada, قهوة عربية)—typically the domain of the Bedouins, consisting of ground fire-roasted beans and cardamom drawn thin and served in espresso-sized servings.
 Lime-mint juice—consists of lemon and mint.
 Qamar eddine (قمر الدين‎)—apricot juice, usually served in Ramadan.
 Sahlab (سحلب)—boiled milk with starch from Orchis tubers, covered with smashed coconut and cinnamon.
 Shaneeneh (شنينة)—a refreshing Jordanian beverage, consists of salty-sour aged goat milk yogurt, served cold.
 Tamar hindi (تمر هندي)—a very popular sweet-and-sour Ramadan drink made with tamarind juice.
 Tea (شاي أسود)—usually black tea, typically flavored with na'na (mint) or meramiyyeh (sage) with copious amounts of sugar. Alghazaleen and Lipton are the most popular brands of tea in Jordan.
 Turkish-style coffee (قهوة تركية)—significantly stronger than its Arabic brother. Water is heated in a long-handled metal cup and the grounds (and any sugar) are mixed in as the combination is brewed over a gas flame to bubbling.

See also

 Arab cuisine
 Beer in Jordan
 Jordanian wine
 Lebanese cuisine
 Levantine cuisine
 Palestinian cuisine
 Syrian cuisine

References

External links
 The Flavor of Jordan video

 
Arab cuisine
Levantine cuisine
Middle Eastern cuisine